The women's hammer throw event at the 2014 Asian Games was held at the Incheon Asiad Main Stadium, Incheon, South Korea on 28 September. The competition was won by Zhang Wenxiu of China. Zhang was disqualified after testing positive for the prohibited substance zeranol, but the Court of Arbitration for Sport reinstated her on appeal after ruling that the zeranol came from contaminated food.

Schedule
All times are Korea Standard Time (UTC+09:00)

Records

Results

References

Results

Hammer throw women
2014 women